German submarine U-559 was a Type VIIC U-boat built for Nazi Germany's Kriegsmarine for service during World War II.

Laid down on 1 February 1940 at the Blohm & Voss shipyards in Hamburg as "Baunummer 535" ("Yard number 535"), she was launched on 8 January 1941 and commissioned on 27 February under Kapitänleutnant Hans Heidtmann.

She began her service career with the 1st U-boat Flotilla, undergoing training before being declared operational on 1 June 1941. She moved to the 29th U-boat Flotilla on 15 April 1942. She sank five ships but is perhaps best remembered for an incident during her sinking in the Mediterranean Sea in 1942, in which British sailors seized cryptographic material from her. This material was extremely valuable in breaking the U-boat Enigma machine cipher.

Design
German Type VIIC submarines were preceded by the shorter Type VIIB submarines. U-559 had a displacement of  when at the surface and  while submerged. She had two shafts and two  propellers.

U-559 was fitted with five  torpedo tubes (four fitted at the bow and one at the stern), fourteen torpedoes, one  SK C/35 naval gun, 220 rounds, and a  C/30 anti-aircraft gun. The boat had a complement of between forty-four and sixty.

Service history
U-559 was originally intended to serve as an Atlantic U-boat during the Battle of the Atlantic against Allied convoys in the Western Approaches.

First and second patrols
Her first patrol took her from Kiel on 4 June 1941, across the North Sea and through the gap between Greenland and Iceland. She arrived at St. Nazaire in occupied France on 5 July.

She returned to her French base on 22 August 1941.

Third patrol
For her third patrol, beginning on 20 September, she was assigned to the 'Goeben' group, which were the first U-boats to enter the Mediterranean in World War II through the heavily defended Strait of Gibraltar. She reached Salamis in Greece, after having first investigated the Libyan/Egyptian border.

Fourth patrol

Fifth, sixth and seventh patrols
On her fifth patrol, which began on 8 December 1941, the boat sank  on the 23rd. Shuntien carried 850 – 1,100 German and Italian prisoners of war. Between 800 and 1,000 people were killed, including at least 700 PoWs.

Her sixth and seventh patrols were both from Salamis to the area of the Libyan coast. They were without success.

Eighth and ninth patrols
Having moved to Pula in Croatia in March 1942, she then sortied on 18 May, and damaged the oiler Brambleleaf on 10 June.

Her ninth patrol, however, was without success.

Wolfpacks
U-559 took part in one wolfpack, namely:
 Goeben (20 September – 5 October 1941)

Fate
It was her own demise that made her most famous. At about 05:00 on 30 October 1942, U-559 was spotted by a Royal Air Force Sunderland, W from 201 Squadron in position , 70 miles north of the Nile Delta. At about 12:34 a Wellesley patrol aircraft, F from 47 Squadron, spotted the periscope of the submerged U-559 and attacked with depth charges.

The destroyer group hunted for the U-boat for 16 hours, constantly depth charging. After dark, U-559, with a cracked pressure hull, unable to maintain level trim and four of her crew dead from explosions and flooding, was forced to the surface. She was close to Petard, which immediately opened fire with her Oerlikon 20 mm cannon.

The German crew hurriedly scrambled overboard without destroying their codebooks or Enigma machine and, crucially, having failed to open all the sea-water vents to scuttle the U-boat properly. Three Royal Navy sailors, Lieutenant Anthony Fasson, Able Seaman Colin Grazier and NAAFI canteen assistant Tommy Brown, then boarded the abandoned submarine. There are differing reports as to how the three British men boarded the U-boat. Some accounts (such as that of Kahn) say that they "swam naked" to U-559, which was sinking, but slowly. Sebag-Montefiore states that they either leapt from Petard or, in Brown's case, from a whaler. They retrieved the U-boat's Enigma key setting sheets with all current settings for the U-boat Enigma network. Two German crew members, rescued from the sea, watched this material being loaded into Petard'''s whaler but were dissuaded from interfering by an armed guard. Grazier and Fasson were inside the U-boat, attempting to get out, when it foundered; both drowned.

Aftermath
Grazier and Fasson were awarded the George Cross posthumously, Brown was awarded the George Medal. The Victoria Cross was considered but not awarded, for the ostensible reason that their bravery was not "in the face of the enemy". Another consideration may have been that a Victoria Cross would have drawn unwanted attention to the U-boat's capture from German intelligence. It was also discovered that Brown had lied about his age in order to enlist, and was only 16 years old, making him one of the youngest recipients of the George Medal. He was discharged and returned home to North Shields, only to die two years later attempting to rescue his younger sister from a house fire.

The code-book material they retrieved was immensely valuable to the code-breakers at Bletchley Park, who had been unable to read the 4-rotor U-boat Enigma for ten months since its introduction by the German Kriegsmarine at the beginning of 1942. This captured material allowed them to read the cyphers for several weeks, and to break U-boat Enigma thereafter right through to the end of the war.

The recovery was one of several such events (e.g., the earlier capture of ), that inspired the fictional account of the submarine capture in the 2000 film U-571.

Summary of raiding history

See also
 Mediterranean U-boat Campaign (World War II)

References

Notes

Citations

Bibliography

 Kahn, David; Seizing the Enigma: The Race to Break the German U-Boats Codes, 1939-1943'', (1991)

External links

 Memorial page for Fasson and Grazier {reference only}

Enigma machine
German Type VIIC submarines
World War II submarines of Germany
World War II shipwrecks in the Mediterranean Sea
U-boats commissioned in 1941
1941 ships
U-boats sunk in 1942
Ships built in Hamburg
U-boats sunk by depth charges
U-boats sunk by British warships
Maritime incidents in October 1942